Gabrk is a small village on the left bank of the Poljane Sora River in the Municipality of Škofja Loka in the Upper Carniola region of Slovenia.

Name
Gabrk was attested in historical sources as Gabrich in 1286, Gaberch in 1296, Gabriach circa 1400, and Gaberkch in 1414. The name comes from the common noun *gabrik 'hornbeam forest' (from gaber 'hornbeam'), referring to the local vegetation.

References

External links 

Gabrk at Geopedia

Populated places in the Municipality of Škofja Loka